Boubacari Doucouré (born 19 March 1999) is a French professional footballer who plays as a defender for Serbian club Javor Ivanjica.

Career
On 8 June 2020, Doucouré signed his first professional contract with Chambly. He made his Ligue 2 debut with the club in a 3–0 loss to Clermont on 16 October 2020. In the second half of the 2020–21 season, Doucouré was loaned out to Javor Ivanjica in Serbia.

Personal life
Born in France, Doucouré is of Malian descent. He is the younger brother of the footballer Lassana Doucouré, who also played with him at Chambly.

References

External links
 
 

1999 births
Living people
People from Beaumont-sur-Oise
French footballers
French people of Malian descent
Association football defenders
FC Chambly Oise players
FK Javor Ivanjica players
FK TSC Bačka Topola players
Ligue 2 players
Championnat National players
Championnat National 2 players
Championnat National 3 players
Serbian SuperLiga players
French expatriate footballers
Expatriate footballers in Serbia
French expatriate sportspeople in Serbia
Footballers from Val-d'Oise